Dancing Stage MegaMiX is the fifth home release in the Dancing Stage series, a European version of the Dance Dance Revolution series of music video games. MegaMix was the first Dancing Stage game released on the Sony PlayStation 2 game console - and as with Dancing Stage EuroMix 2, MegaMix introduced many new features to Europe, such as Freeze Arrows, the Options menu, and a cleaner interface. Based largely on Dancing Stage EuroMix 2, MegaMiX was separated from the arcade game by a completely different track list of songs. The game was marketed by Konami as a family game and an exercise tool in efforts to make the niche series more mainstream.

Gameplay

The gameplay of Dancing Stage MegaMiX is exactly like Dancing Stage EuroMIX 2, which had been released the previous year. Players who had not played EuroMIX 2 would be introduced to Konami's "Freeze Arrow" in this game, where players have to step on the correct arrow and hold their foot down until the game signaled to release it. This added more dynamics to the overall gameplay of MegaMiX and introduced situations where the player is forced to hold one foot down and hit a series of arrows solely with the other foot, maintaining balance at the same time. For beginner players MegaMiX was the first console title to feature the Beginner difficulty level, containing the absolute easiest steps possible for a song, never featuring anything beyond the most simple of step patterns, and utilizing an on-screen guide to assist

Dancing Stage MegaMiX uses the exact two-tiered scoring system that EuroMIX 2 does, but the judgment is less forgiving than EuroMIX 2, however there is a slightly larger window for perfects making it easier to pass a song overall.

As with EuroMIX 2, Dancing Stage MegaMiX was based on the Japanese release DDRMAX2: Dance Dance Revolution 7thMIX, but with modifications such as difficulty selection being done before the song instead of being offered before the song wheel (but being changeable with codes). Challenge Mode was replaced with Nonstop Mode, again to mimic EuroMIX 2. In total, the gameplay modes include the traditional game and nonstop modes, Workout Mode, Lesson Mode (containing tutorials), Training Mode (allowing the player to practice specific portions of songs), and Endless Mode, most of these modes and one additional song are unlocked through regular play.

Modifiers
Unlike EuroMIX 2, Dancing Stage MegaMiX implements the new Options Menu which debuted on DDRMAX: Dance Dance Revolution 6thMIX, allowing easier access to modifiers which required special codes entered on the difficulty selection screen on previous versions.

Interface & graphics
The visual interface was completely overhauled for the console Dancing Stage series. For the first time the game played at 60fps and doubled the old video resolution from 320x240 to 640x480.  Full motion background videos completely replaced the aging background animation engine, and Konami's signature dancing characters were omitted from the game for the first time on a European home version. Graphical karaoke style lyrics are displayed during some songs when there are spoken words. Occasionally videos are specifically made for a certain song, and in Dancing Stage MegaMiX's case, some licensed tracks contain their original music video in the background.

Music

Courses
Note: The colors indicate the preset difficulty of the songs in the courses; STANDARD is yellow, DIFFICULT is red, and EXPERT is green.

Notable music
MAX 300 - First seen in DDRMAX: Dance Dance Revolution 6thMIX. As the title suggests, this song plays at 300 BPM, The song is usually considered to be the first 10-foot difficulty song, and is also notably the only unlockable song.

Other versions
On September 26, 2003, Konami released a localized version of Dancing Stage MegaMiX to the Australian audience. The game was simply re-rated and there were no changes made that sets it apart from the European release.

Reception

Konami launched Dancing Stage MegaMiX with promotional ads in game magazines and videos. Konami attempted to reach the "underground" dancing crowd with the slogan "Take the Stage" and a television spot that displayed hip, young teens breakdancing on the dance mats to the songs in the game.

The general public took the new game with mixed emotions. While many praised the introduction of the Dancing Stage series on the PlayStation 2 and how it brought with it better graphics and smoother gameplay, others were chastising the meager song selection it brought to the table. Released against the home version of DDRMAX2 Dance Dance Revolution 7thMIX in Japan and the North American DDRMAX2 Dance Dance Revolution, it was considered the weakest of the three and hardcore European fans recommended importing one of the other two or picking up an older release instead. In the end, however, most people were happy with the game overall and gave it points for being one of the best Dancing Stage games at the time.

See also
DDRMAX2 Dance Dance Revolution 7thMix
DDRMAX2 Dance Dance Revolution

References

External links
Dancing Stage MegaMix at Konami Europe
Konami of Europe Konami Europe Corporate Information
The scoring system for DDR MAX 2 Scoring formula used in Dancing Stage MegaMix

2003 video games
Dance Dance Revolution games
PlayStation 2-only games
Video games developed in Germany
PlayStation 2 games